Henry James Fletcher (28 February 1868 – 22 January 1933) was a New Zealand missionary and presbyterian minister. He was born in Denton, Kent, England on 28 February 1868.

References

External links
 

1868 births
1933 deaths
English Presbyterian missionaries
New Zealand Presbyterians
People from Dover District
Presbyterian missionaries in New Zealand